Psammoecus delicatus, is a species of silvan flat bark beetle found in India, Sri Lanka, Taiwan, Singapore, and Indonesia.

Description
Average length is about 2.38 to 2.98 mm. Head and pronotum yellowish-brown. Elytra also yellowish-brown with several x-shaped blackish-brown maculae. Head wide with gradually narrowed temples toward bases. Eyes are large, and prominent. Elytra oval with rows of punctures. In male genitalia, spiculum gastrale characterized with short, thick strut and enlarged around base.

Prothorax markedly transverse, and strongly depressed in front of prothoracic base. Lateral sides of the prothorax widely explanate. There are narrow teeth on lateral margin of prothorax which are long. Antennal joints are distinctly elongated where the basal part is yellowish-brown. Scape is about three times longer than wide. Apical part of joint 6 and joints 7-9 are black in color. The joints 10 and 11 are yellowish white in color.

References 

Silvanidae
Insects of Sri Lanka
Insects of India
Insects described in 1908